The Bell V-247 Vigilant is a concept by Bell Helicopter to develop a large tiltrotor unmanned aerial vehicle.

Development
It is named V-247 by the company because it is planned that a two-aircraft team can provide 24/7 intelligence, surveillance and reconnaissance (ISR) over a given area. The design uses tiltrotors to take off vertically and transition to high-speed forward flight, enabling performance unachievable with just rotorcraft or fixed-wing aircraft. It leverages technologies which Bell previously utilized for the V-22 Osprey and V-280 Valor for the Future Vertical Lift program, and the HV-911 Eagle Eye, another smaller unmanned tiltrotor dropped in 2008. The aircraft is capable of performing a variety of missions including electronic warfare, persistent fire support, airborne early warning (AEW), and resupply. Bell is particularly interested in the U.S. Marine Corps' Marine Air Ground Task Force – Unmanned Expeditionary Capabilities (MUX) concept to perform the tasks of MQ-1 Predator and Reaper aircraft while operating from amphibious assault ships to complement and escort the MV-22. The U.S. Army is also interested in runway-independent unmanned aircraft, and the Vigilant could be incorporated into manned-unmanned teaming (MUM-T) arrangements where helicopter pilots have the ability to control nearby drones from the cockpit using a tactical common data-link. A 1/8-scale model was unveiled on 22 September 2016, and the system could be ready for production by 2023. While Bell is funding the V-247 through its preliminary design phase, the company is searching for a customer, likely the USMC, to fund the follow-on design effort to incorporate specific requirements into the design.

Design
While the V-22 and V-280 use two engines located within the tiltrotor pylons, the V-247 will have a single engine housed in the fuselage generating 5,000-6,000 shp (3,670-4,410 kW), about as much as the V-22's engines. Like the V-280, it has a V-shaped tail and one long wing piece mated to the top of the fuselage as well as retractable tricycle landing gear. To enable size compatibility with U.S. Navy  guided missile destroyers, the wing and rotors swivel along the -long fuselage to have the same footprint as the UH-1Y Venom helicopter; two folded up V-247s can fit inside one C-17 Globemaster III transport aircraft. The Vigilant is equipped with three internal payload bays, a centerline payload, and the capability to house up to two underwing pylons per side for various payloads including additional fuel, radar systems, LiDAR modules, sonobuoys, the Mark 50 torpedo, AGM-114 Hellfire, and Joint Air-to-Ground Missile (JAGM).

See also

References

External links
 Bell Helicopter Introduces Bell V-247 “Vigilant” Tiltrotor Unmanned Aerial System in Ship-Borne Configuration
 Bell Helicopter unveils V-247 Vigilant unmanned tiltrotor aircraft - Air Recognition

V-247 Vigilant
Tiltrotor aircraft
Unmanned military aircraft of the United States
High-wing aircraft